Into Her Kingdom is a 1926 American silent film featuring a Technicolor sequence which dramatizes the Russian Revolution. It was based on a 1925 short story of the same name by Ruth Comfort Mitchell, originally published in Red Book Magazine. It is not known whether the film currently survives.

Production
This was the second to last directorial effort of Svend Gade in the United States before returning to Denmark. At the time of production, several expatriate members of Czarist Russian nobility and military class were living in the Los Angeles area and working as extras in films. Some were recruited to serves as cast members and technical advisors on this film. In a Technicolor insert, running 221 feet, the Weaver of Fate picks out multicolored cords and plays tricks with them. The red cord represents the girl and the brown cord represents the boy.

References

External links
 
 
 lantern slide
 

1926 films
American black-and-white films
American silent feature films
1926 drama films
Films set in Russia
First National Pictures films
Silent American drama films
Films based on short fiction
Films directed by Svend Gade
1920s American films